Stamnodes affiliata is a species of geometrid moth in the family Geometridae. It is found in North America.

The MONA or Hodges number for Stamnodes affiliata is 7337.

References

Further reading

 
 

Stamnodini
Articles created by Qbugbot
Moths described in 1911